This list of electoral wards in Swansea includes council wards in City and County of Swansea, Wales, which elect councillors to City and County of Swansea Council.

The county is divided into 32 electoral divisions, returning a total of 75 county councillors. Some of these divisions are coterminous with communities (civil parishes) of the same name. Some communities have their own elected community council. 

A boundary review changed a number of county wards, affective from the 2022 local elections.

Current wards

City and county wards
The following table lists the post-2022 city and county wards, the numbers of councillors elected and the communities they cover:

* = Communities which elect a community council
c = Ward coterminous with community of the same name

Community council wards

2022 ward changes
In 2021 a large number of proposals by the Local Democracy and Boundary Commission for Wales were  confirmed, to reduce the number of wards to Swansea Council, from 36 to 32, but with the number of councillors increasing from 72 to 75. This was designed to make the ratio between councillors and voters more equal.

Fifteen ward boundaries would be unaffected (though with a few name changes): Bishopston, Bonymaen (now Bon-y-maen), Cwmbwrla, Fairwood, Landore, Llansamlet, Mayals, Morriston, Mynyddbach (now Mynydd-bach), Penclawdd, Penderry, Penllergaer, Sketty, Townhill and Uplands.

The large Mawr ward ceased to exist, it's communities divied amongst neighbouring wards and a new ward of Pontlliw and Tircoed created. A Mumbles ward was created by merging the Newton and Oystermouth wards. A Llwchwr ward was created by merging Kingsbridge, Lower Loughor and Upper Loughor. A new Waterfront ward was created from parts of the Castle ward and St Thomas ward. A new Waunarlwyd ward was created from part of Cockett. Dunvant, Killay North and Killay South were merged to create a Dunvant and Killay ward. The Gorseinon and Penyrheol wards were combined to become Gorseinon and Penyrheol.

Pre-2022 wards

Prior to a 2021 ward boundary review, the city was divided into 36 electoral wards. Most of these wards were coterminous with communities (parishes) of the same name. Each community can have an elected council. The following table lists pre-2022 council wards, communities and associated geographical areas. Communities with a community council are indicated with a '*':

* = Communities which elect a community council
c = Ward coterminous with community of the same name

See also
 List of electoral wards in Wales

References

Swansea